Denis Georgiyevich Snimshchikov (born 7 December 1975) is a former Russian professional football player.

Club career
He played two seasons in the Russian Football National League for FC Dynamo Makhachkala and FC Mordovia Saransk.

References

1975 births
Sportspeople from Volgograd
Living people
Russian footballers
Association football midfielders
FC Olimpia Volgograd players
FC Lokomotiv Nizhny Novgorod players
FC Mordovia Saransk players
FC Dynamo Makhachkala players